"Cowboy" is a song by Kid Rock from his album Devil Without a Cause. The song, noted for its country rap style, reflects a cross-section of Kid Rock's country, Southern rock and hip hop influences, having been described by the artist as a cross between Run DMC and Lynyrd Skynyrd.

"Cowboy" was Kid Rock's first single to chart on the Billboard Hot 100, peaking at number 82, while reaching number 10 on the Mainstream Rock charts. With its lyrics about pimping and traveling to California, the song is considered to be one of Kid Rock's best works, and has been claimed as greatly influencing modern country music and as the first country rap song.

Artistry
Musically, "Cowboy" is a fusion of hip hop, country, southern rock and heavy metal. Billboard, as well as Kid Rock himself, described the song as a cross between Run DMC and Lynyrd Skynyrd. The song's music style has been described as "country rap", "cowboy rap" and "rap rock". AXS called it "the first country rap song".

The instrumentation includes Jew's harp, blues harmonica and a piano solo which quotes the Doors song "L.A. Woman".

The lyrics feature Kid Rock rapping about moving to California to become a pimp, and start an escort service "for all the right reasons", located at the top of the Four Seasons Hotel, as well as getting thrown out of bars and buying a yacht.

Lawsuit
In 2002, the music group Boys Don't Cry filed suit against Kid Rock, claiming the song "Cowboy" was derivative of their 1986 synth-pop track "I Wanna Be a Cowboy", and alleged that Kid Rock, while DJing in Detroit, had played the song; the suit claimed that Kid Rock had taken the bassline and adapted his chorus from the 1986 song.

Reception
"Cowboy" was named one of the "ten worst songs about cowboys" by the Houston Press, while numerous other critics and journalists have called it one of Kid Rock's best songs, including writers for AXS and Billboard.

The Village Voice writer Chaz Kangas called "Cowboy" a classic song, writing, "in the Clinton era when your most viable pop stars were pristine teen-pop sensations, raucous nu-metal antagonists or alternative-to-alternative-to-alternative rock weirdos, Rock stood alone. It’s been a surprising 15 years since, but 'Cowboy' remains one track from this era that’s timeless without even trying to be."

Legacy
"Cowboy" is considered to be the first country rap song, and was influential on the music styles described as "hick-hop" and "bro country". Cowboys & Indians claims that "Cowboy" had a major impact on the country music scene; the magazine alleges that artists Jason Aldean and Big & Rich, among others, were influenced by the song's country rap style.

Kid Rock performed the song at the Super Bowl XXXVIII halftime show.

Country singer Kenny Chesney has covered the song in concert in 2009 and 2016, the latter with Kid Rock on Chesney's Spread the Love Tour.

In 2017, Kid Rock joined country singer Chris Janson on stage for mashup of Janson's song "Buy Me A Boat" and "Cowboy".

Personnel
 Kid Rock – vocals, banjo, acoustic guitar, piano, harp
 Bobby East – slide guitar, electric guitar
 Matt O'Brien – bass guitar
 Kenny Tudrick – drums
 Misty Love – background vocals
 Shirley Hayden – background vocals

Charts

References

External links

1998 singles
Kid Rock songs
Country rap songs
Music videos directed by Dave Meyers (director)
Songs involved in plagiarism controversies
Songs written by Kid Rock
Songs about cowboys and cowgirls